Bob Hewitt and Greer Stevens were the defending champions but did not compete.

Frew McMillan and Betty Stöve defeated Ray Ruffels and Billie Jean King in the final, 6–2, 6–2 to win the mixed doubles tennis title at the 1978 Wimbledon Championships.

Seeds

  Frew McMillan /  Betty Stöve (champions)
  Ray Ruffels /  Billie Jean King (final)
  Geoff Masters /  Virginia Wade (third round)
  Tony Roche /  Françoise Dürr (semifinals)
  Marty Riessen /  Wendy Turnbull (third round)
  Ross Case /  Mona Guerrant (second round)
  Raz Reid /  Kerry Reid (second round)
  Fred McNair /  Lesley Hunt (third round)

Draw

Finals

Top half

Section 1

Section 2

Bottom half

Section 3

Section 4

References

External links

1978 Wimbledon Championships – Doubles draws and results at the International Tennis Federation

X=Mixed Doubles
Wimbledon Championship by year – Mixed doubles